This is a list of Thai male actors. It is customary for Thais to be grouped by their given name, not their family name, even if they have taken a Western name.

A
Akara Amarttayakul
Akkaphan Namart
Alex Rendell
Amphol Lampoon
Anan Anwar
Ananda Everingham
Archen Aydin
Art Supawatt Purdy (known in Thailand as Supawatt Aumprasit)
Atthaphan Phunsawat

B
Boriboon Chanrueng

C
Chakrit Yamnam
Chanon Santinatornkul
Chantavit Dhanasevi
Charlie Trairat
Chartchai Ngamsan
Chatchai Plengpanich
Chatchawit Techarukpong
Chatthapong Pantanaunkul
Chonlathorn Kongyingyong

D
Daweerit Chullasapya
Dome Pakorn Lam

G
Golf & Mike
Gunn Junhavat

H
Harit Cheewagaroon

I
Itthipat Thanit

J
Jackrin Kungwankiatichai
James Ma
Jesdaporn Pholdee
Jinjett Wattanasin
Jirakit Kuariyakul
Jirakit Thawornwong
Jirayu La-Ongmanee
Jirayu Tangsrisuk
Joni Anwar
Joey Boy
Jumpol Adulkittiporn

K
Kanaphan Puitrakul
Kanawut Traipipattanapong
Kay Lertsittichai
Korapat Kirdpan
Kornchid Boonsathitpakdee
Krissada Pornweroj
Krissada Sukosol Clapp
Krissanapoom Pibulsonggram
Krit Amnuaydechkorn
Krit Sripoomseth

L
Lapat Ngamchaweng
Lor Tok
Luke Ishikawa Plowden

M
Mario Maurer
Metawin Opas-iamkajorn
Michael Shaowanasai
Mick Tongraya
Mitr Chaibancha
Mum Jokmok

N
Nadech Kugimiya
Naphat Siangsomboon
Nawat Phumphotingam
Nichkhun Horvejkul

O
Oabnithi Wiwattanawarang

P
Pachara Chirathivat
Pakorn Chatborirak
Paris Intarakomalyasut
Patiparn Pataweekarn
Pattadon Janngeon
Pawat Chittsawangdee
Perawat Sangpotirat
Peter Corp Dyrendal
Phiravich Attachitsataporn
Phuwin Tangsakyuen
Pirapat Watthanasetsiri
Pluem Pongpisal
Pongpat Wachirabunjong
Pongsak Pongsuwan
Prachaya Ruangroj
Prin Suparat
Putthipong Assaratanakul
Putthipong Sriwat
Puttichai Kasetsin

R
Rathavit Kijworalak
Ray MacDonald
Rangsiroj Panpeng

S
Sahaphap Wongratch
Saran Sirilak
Sivakorn Adulsuttikul
Sombat Metanee
Somlek Sakdikul
Somluck Kamsing
Sorapong Chatree
Sornram Teppitak
Sukollawat Kanarot
Sukrit Wisetkaew
Sunny Suwanmethanon
Supakorn Kitsuwon
Suppasit Jongcheveevat
Suppapong Udomkaewkanjana
Suradet Piniwat
Suthep Po-ngam
Suwinit Panjamawat

T
Talay Sanguandikul
Tanapon Sukhumpantanasan
Tanit Jitnukul
Tanutchai Wijitwongthong
Tawan Vihokratana
Teeradon Supapunpinyo
Thanapob Leeratanakachorn
Thanat Lowkhunsombat
Thanatsaran Samthonglai
Theeradej Wongpuapan
Thiti Mahayotaruk
Thitipoom Techaapaikhun
Thongchai McIntyre
Tony Jaa
Toon Hiranyasap

U
Uttsada Panichkul

V
 Vachiravit Paisarnkulwong
 Vachirawit Chiva-aree

W
Wan Thanakrit
Wachirawit Ruangwiwat
Way-Ar Sangngern
Weerayut Chansook
Winai Kraibutr
Witwisit Hiranyawongkul
Wongravee Nateetorn
Worrawech Danuwong

List
Actors
Lists of male actors